Four Faces of God is a 2002 film directed by Anthony Hartman. Written by Hartman and Jango Sircus, the film stars Leon Robinson as Jah, Robert LaSardo as Tony, and Jaime King as Sam.

Cast
 Leon Robinson as Jah
 Robert LaSardo as Tony
 Jaime King as Sam
 William Knight as Father Pecato
 Marc Rose as Joey
 Nicholas Stratton as Altar Boy

External links
 

2002 films
2000s English-language films
American short films